Shiraz Ali Khan is an Indian Sarod Player. He is the youngest member of the Maihar Seniya Gharana (also known as Maihar Gharana).

Family Background
Shiraz Ali Khan is the great-grandson of Ustad Baba Allauddin Khan, grandson of Ustad Ali Akbar Khan, grand nephew of Smt. Annapurna Devi, son of Ustad Dhyanesh Khan and nephew of Ustad Aashish Khan.

References

Living people
Indian male classical musicians
Bengali people
Musicians from Kolkata
Year of birth missing (living people)